Murder at Lilac Cottage is a 1940 detective novel by John Rhode, the pen name of the British writer Cecil Street. It is the thirty third in his long-running series of novels featuring Lancelot Priestley, a Golden Age armchair detective. In the Times Literary Supplement  reviewer Maurice Willson Disher noted "With both ingenuity and originality at command, he will keep puzzle-solvers guessing until it pleases Dr. Priestley to explain why clues are not what they seem." while Ralph Partridge gave it a broadly positive review in the New Statesman.

Synopsis
In a largely peaceful village in England during the early stages of the Second World War the body of the young man who owns Lilac Cottage is found dead. The only clue that the investigating officers of Scotland Yard can find is a five pound note, but it lures Priestley to the trail. A second murder takes place nearby soon afterwards, puzzling to most, but to Priestley it confirms the theory he is already developing.

References

Bibliography
 Herbert, Rosemary. Whodunit?: A Who's Who in Crime & Mystery Writing. Oxford University Press, 2003.
 Magill, Frank Northen . Critical Survey of Mystery and Detective Fiction: Authors, Volume 4. Salem Press, 1988.
 Reilly, John M. Twentieth Century Crime & Mystery Writers. Springer, 2015.

1940 British novels
Novels by Cecil Street
British crime novels
British mystery novels
British thriller novels
British detective novels
Collins Crime Club books
Novels set in London
Novels set in England